The Suburban East Conference is a Minnesota State High School League conference in the Twin Cities, Minnesota. Member schools field a full complement of 30 interscholastic sports and 14 Fine Arts activities.

Member Schools

References

External links
Suburban East Conference website

Minnesota high school sports conferences
High school sports conferences and leagues in the United States